Mohammad Amin Rezaei (born 21 August 1996) is an Iranian professional footballer who plays for Nassaji in the Persian Gulf Pro League as a goalkeeper.

References 

1996 births
Living people
Iranian footballers
Nassaji Mazandaran players
Association football goalkeepers
People from Amol
Sportspeople from Mazandaran province